The Confiserie Sprüngli is a Swiss luxury confectionery manufacturer founded in 1836 and internationally known for its signature macarons called "Luxemburgerli".

History 
The company was founded in 1836 when David Sprüngli bought the confectioner's shop Konditorei Vogel in Zürich. Together with his son Rudolf Sprüngli he started producing chocolates, as David Sprüngli & Fils (engl. David Sprüngli & Son), in 1845 and opened the well-known shop on Paradeplatz in 1859. In 1892, the chocolate-producing branch of the business split off from the confectionery and now operates independently as Lindt & Sprüngli. Owner of the chocolate factory became Johann Rudolf Sprüngli, son of Rudolf Sprüngli. While his brother, David Robert Sprüngli, was allocated the confectioner's.

In 1956, Richard Sprüngli took over the confiserie and positioned it as a luxury brand. A year later, Sprüngli sold the first Luxemburgerli, a macaron invented by a Sprüngli confectioner from Luxembourg. Since 1994, the family-owned company has been led by the brothers Tomas and Milan Prenosil, sixth-generation descendants of Rudolf Sprüngli.

Owners 
There have been five changes in ownership of the business since its 1836 founding by David Sprüngli.
 David Sprüngli, 1836–1859
 Rudolf Sprüngli, 1859–1892
 David Robert Sprüngli, 1892–1924
 Hermann Sprüngli, 1924–1956
 Richard Sprüngli, 1956–1994
 Milan und Tomas Prenosil, 1994–present

Products and facilities 

As of 2010, Sprüngli employs some 1,000 staff, has annual sales of more than 100 million Swiss francs and a range of 2,000 products, including ice cream and bakery goods. The company has 29 retail outlets, some of which also include restaurants. The main store is located on Bahnhofstrasse and Paradeplatz, while smaller outlets are found elsewhere in Zürich, as well as in Basel, Bern, Winterthur and Zug. Sprüngli products are also delivered worldwide by air mail and, since 1961, have been produced in Dietikon near Zürich. In 2017, Sprüngli opened an outlet in the Galleria Mall on Al Maryah Island in Abu Dhabi. Nowadays, there are three retail shops in the UAE. 

The Sprüngli café on Paradeplatz is a traditional meeting-place of the elderly ladies of Zürich's upper class. Local folklore has it that young men who attend the café alone may signal their availability to these well-to-do women by turning over their coffee spoons in their cups. But according to the company's director, this is a persistent myth reflecting Zürich's more puritanical past, when the Sprüngli café was one of the few places where upper-class women could talk to strangers without risking their reputation.

Since March 2021, Sprüngli has a cooperation with Swiss International Air Lines.

Further reading 

 Deborah Cadbury (2010): Chocolate Wars. The 150-Year Rivalry Between the World's Greatest Chocolate Makers. Public Affairs, e-book.

References

External links 

 Official website

Privately held companies of Switzerland
Manufacturing companies based in Zürich
Culture of Zürich
Tourist attractions in Zürich
Swiss chocolate companies
Food and drink companies of Switzerland
Food and drink companies established in 1836
Swiss companies established in 1836